Hale is a Railway point and unincorporated place in geographic Templeton Township, Algoma District in Northeastern Ontario, Canada. The community is counted as part of Unorganized Algoma North Part in Canadian census data.

Hale is on the Algoma Central Railway, between the communities of Kennedy to the south and Boon to the north, and has a passing track.

References

Other map sources:

Communities in Algoma District